Nacogdoches may stand for:

 Nacogdoches, town
 Nacogdoches County, Texas, county
 Nacogdoches, a Native American tribe
 Nacogdoches (album)